The 2002 Estoril Open was a tennis tournament played on outdoor clay courts at the Estoril Court Central in Oeiras in Portugal that was part of the International Series of the 2002 ATP Tour and of Tier IV of the 2002 WTA Tour. The tournament ran from April 8 through April 14, 2002.

Finals

Men's singles

 David Nalbandian defeated  Jarkko Nieminen 6–4, 7–6(7–5)
 It was Nalbandian's 1st title of the year and the 1st of his career.

Women's singles

 Magüi Serna defeated  Anca Barna 6–4, 6–2
 It was Serna's only title of the year and the 2nd of her career.

Men's doubles

 Karsten Braasch /  Andrei Olhovskiy defeated  Simon Aspelin /  Andrew Kratzmann 6–3, 6–3
 It was Braasch's 2nd title of the year and the 5th of his career. It was Olhovskiy's 2nd title of the year and the 22nd of his career.

Women's doubles

 Elena Bovina /  Zsófia Gubacsi defeated  Barbara Rittner /  María Vento-Kabchi 6–3, 6–1
 It was Bovina's 1st title of the year and the 3rd of her career. It was Gubacsi's only title of the year and the 2nd of her career.

External links
 Official website
 ATP Tournament Profile
 WTA Tournament Profile

Estoril Open
Estoril Open
Portugal Open
Estoril Open
 Estoril Open